Born Dead Icons was a Canadian hardcore punk band from Montreal, Quebec, Canada. They played melodic, heavy and dark d-beat hardcore punk with various influences, mainly British bands Amebix, Discharge, Zounds, and Motörhead.   They are notable for playing slower and singing more clearly than most bands in this genre.  Members also play in the band Complications. The band played their last show in November 2007.

Members
Francis Lavoie: guitar, vocals
Pete Beaudoin - guitar
Philippe Légaré - bass, vocals
Alex Légaré: drums

Discography

Studio albums
Work (2000)
Salvation on the Knees (2001)
Ruins (2003)

EPs
Part of Something Larger Than Ourselves (1999)
Modern Plague 7" (2001)
New Scream Industry (2001)
Unlearn 7" (2003)

Demos
Demo (1999)

Splits
Born Dead Icons / Coma

References

External links
Born Dead Icons on Myspace

Canadian crust and d-beat groups
Musical groups from Montreal
Musical groups established in 1999
Musical groups disestablished in 2007
1999 establishments in Quebec